Californiulus is a genus of cylindrical millipedes containing six species native to the western United States.

Description
Species of Californiulus exhibit two major color patterns. Some are characterized by a broad stripe of light brown, orange or yellow extending down the dorsal surface, while others are banded in light brown against a dark gray or black base color.

Distribution
The constituent species of Californiulus range from northern Washington south to Death Valley, California, and one species occurs separate from the others in a range from extreme eastern Oregon to Montana.

References

Julida
Millipedes of North America